Aadel may refer to:

People
 Aadel Bülow-Hansen (1906–2001), Norwegian physiotherapist
 Aadel Kardooni (born 1968), British-Iranian rugby union player
 Aadel Lampe (1857–1944), Norwegian women's rights leader
 Reda Aadel (born 1990), Moroccan cyclist

Places
 Ait Aadel, small town and rural commune in Al Haouz Province of the Marrakech-Tensift-Al Haouz region of Morocco

Other
 Aadil, male given name